Rosin, also called colophony or Greek pitch, is a solid form of resin obtained from pines and some other plants, mostly conifers, produced by heating fresh liquid resin to vaporize the volatile liquid terpene components. It is semi-transparent and varies in color from yellow to black. At room temperature rosin is brittle, but it melts at stove-top temperature. It chiefly consists of various resin acids, especially abietic acid.

Properties

Rosin is brittle and friable, with a faint piny odor. It is typically a glassy solid, though some rosins will form crystals, especially when brought into solution. The practical melting point varies with different specimens, some being semi-fluid at the temperature of boiling water, others melting at 100 °C to 120 °C. It is very flammable, burning with a smoky flame, so care should be taken when melting it. It is soluble in alcohol, ether, benzene and chloroform.

Rosin consists mainly of abietic acid, and combines with caustic alkalis to form salts (rosinates or pinates) that are known as rosin soaps. In addition to its extensive use in soap making, rosin is largely employed in making varnishes (including fine violin varnishes), sealing wax and various adhesives. It is also used for preparing shoemakers' wax, for pitching lager beer casks, and numerous other purposes such as providing backing surfaces to tin ware, copper ware, or even silver and gold vessels when embossing or engraving them. Its relatively low melting point, and firm solid form allows liquid rosin to be poured into the vessel, and when cooled allows embossing or engraving of the vessel without deforming the vessel - even if it has a skin which is quite thin. Afterwards, the object can be reheated in an oven, and the rosin poured out for reuse. Any remaining rosin film can easily be rinsed away with alcohol or other solvents.

Rosin is also sometimes used as internal reinforcement for very thin skinned metal objects - things like silver, copper or tin plate candlesticks, or sculptures, where it is simply melted, poured into a hollow thin-skinned object, and left to harden.

Prolonged exposure to rosin fumes released during soldering can cause occupational asthma (formerly called colophony disease in this context) in sensitive individuals, although it is not known which component of the fumes causes the problem.

The type of rosin used with bowed string instruments is determined by the diameter of the strings. Generally this means that the larger the instrument is, the softer the rosin should be. For instance, double bass rosin is generally soft enough to be pliable with slow movements. A cake of bass rosin left in a single position for several months will show evidence of flow, especially in warmer weather.

Prolonged exposure to rosin, by handling rosin-coated products, such as laser printer or photocopying paper, can give rise to a form of industrial contact dermatitis.

Uses

Rosin is an ingredient in printing inks, photocopying and laser printing paper, varnishes, adhesives (glues), soap, paper sizing, soda, soldering fluxes, and sealing wax.

Rosin can be used as a glazing agent in medicines and chewing gum. It is denoted by E number E915. A related glycerol ester (E445) can be used as an emulsifier in soft drinks. In pharmaceuticals, rosin forms an ingredient in several plasters and ointments.

In industry, rosin is a flux used in soldering. The lead-tin solder commonly used in electronics has 1 to 2% rosin by weight as a flux core, helping the molten metal flow and making a better connection by reducing the refractory solid oxide layer formed at the surface back to metal. It is frequently seen as a burnt or clear residue around new soldering.

A mixture of pitch and rosin is used to make a surface against which glass is polished when making optical components such as lenses.

Rosin is added in small quantities to traditional linseed oil/sand gap fillers ("mastic"), used in building work.

When mixed with waxes and oils, rosin is the main ingredient of mystic smoke, a gum which, when rubbed and suddenly stretched, appears to produce puffs of smoke from the fingertips.

Rosin is extensively used for its friction-increasing capacity in several fields:
 Players of bowed string instruments rub cakes or blocks of rosin on their bow hair so it can grip the strings and make them "speak", or vibrate clearly. Occasionally, substances such as beeswax, gold, silver, tin, or meteoric iron are added to the rosin to modify its stiction/friction properties and the tone that can be produced. Powdered rosin can be applied to new hair, for example with a felt pad or cloth, to reduce the time taken in getting sufficient rosin onto the hair. Rosin is often reapplied immediately before playing the instrument. Lighter rosin is generally preferred for violins and violas, and in high-humidity climates, while darker rosins are preferred for cellos, and for players in cool, dry areas. There are also specific, distinguishing types for basses.
 Violin rosin can be applied to the bridges in other musical instruments, such as the banjo and banjolele, in order to prevent the bridge from moving during vigorous playing.
 Ballet, flamenco, and Irish dancers are known to rub the tips and heels of their shoes in powdered rosin to reduce slippage on clean wooden dance floors or competition/performance stages. It was at one time used in the same way in fencing and is still used as such by boxers.
 Gymnasts and team handball players use it to improve grip. Rock climbers have used it in some locations.
 Olympic weightlifters rub the soles of their weightlifting boots in rosin to improve traction on the platform.
 It is applied to the track surface at the starting line of drag racing courses to improve traction.
 Bull riders rub rosin on their rope and glove for additional grip.
 Baseball pitchers and ten-pin bowlers may use a small cloth bag of powdered rosin for better ball control. Baseball players sometimes combine rosin with sunscreen, creating a very sticky substance that allows far more grip on the ball than the rosin alone will; the use of such a substance is a violation of Major League Baseball rules.
 Rosin can be applied to the hands in aerial acrobatics such as aerial silks and pole dancing to increase grip.

Other uses that are not based on friction:
 Fine art uses rosin for tempera emulsions and as painting-medium component for oil paintings. It is soluble in oil of turpentine and turpentine substitute, and needs to be warmed.
 In a printmaking technique, aquatint rosin is used on the etching plate in order to create surfaces in gray tones.
 In archery, when a new bowstring is being made or waxed for maintenance purposes, rosin may be present in the wax mixture. This provides an amount of tackiness to the string to hold its constituent strands together and reduce wear and fraying.
 Dog groomers use powdered rosin to aid in removal of excess hair from deep in the ear canal.
 Some brands of fly paper use a solution of rosin and rubber as the adhesive.
 Rosin is sometimes used as an ingredient in dubbing wax used in fly tying.
 Rosin is used hot to de-encapsulate epoxy integrated circuits.
 Rosin can be mixed with beeswax and a small amount of linseed oil to affix reeds to reed blocks in accordions.
 Rosin potatoes can be cooked by dropping potatoes into boiling rosin and cooking until they float to the surface.

Rosin and its derivatives also exhibit wide-ranging pharmaceutical applications. Rosin derivatives show excellent film forming and coating properties. They are also used for tablet film and enteric coating purpose. Rosins have also been used to formulate microcapsules and nanoparticles.

Glycerol, sorbitol, and mannitol esters of rosin are used as chewing gum bases for medicinal applications. The degradation and biocompatibility of rosin and rosin-based biomaterials has been examined in vitro and ex vivo.

Production

Rosin is the resinous constituent of the oleo-resin exuded by various species of pine, known in commerce as crude turpentine. The separation of the oleo-resin into the essential oil (spirit of turpentine) and common rosin is accomplished by distillation in large copper stills. Rosin varies in color, according to the age of the tree from which the turpentine is drawn and the degree of heat applied in distillation, from an opaque, almost pitch-black substance through grades of brown and yellow to an almost perfectly transparent colorless glassy mass. The commercial grades are numerous, ranging by letters from A (the darkest) to N (extra pale), superior to which are W (window glass) and WW (water-white) varieties, the latter having about three times the value of the common qualities.

Tall oil rosin is produced during the distillation of crude tall oil, a by-product of the kraft paper making process.

When pine trees are harvested "the resinous portions of fallen or felled trees like longleaf and slash pines, when allowed to remain upon the ground, resist decay indefinitely." This "stump waste", through the use of destructive distillation or solvent processes, can be used to make products including rosin. This type of rosin is typically called wood rosin.

Because the turpentine and pine oil from destructive distillation "become somewhat contaminated with other distillation products", solvent processes are commonly used. In this process, stumps and roots are chipped and soaked in the light end of the heavy naphtha fraction (boiling between ( and ) from a crude oil refinery.  Multi-stage counter-current extraction is commonly used. In this process, fresh naphtha first contacts wood leached in intermediate stages, and naphtha laden with rosin from intermediate stages contacts unleached wood before vacuum distillation to recover naphtha from the rosin, along with fatty acids, turpentine, and other constituents later separated through steam distillation. Leached wood is steamed for additional naphtha recovery prior to burning for energy recovery. After the solvent has been recovered, "the terpene oils are separated by fractional distillation and recovered mainly as refined turpentine, dipentene, and pine oil. The nonvolatile residue from the extract is wood rosin of rather dark color. Upgrading of the rosin is carried out by clarification methods that generally may include bed-filtering or furfural-treatment of rosin-solvent solution."

On a large scale, rosin is treated by destructive distillation for the production of rosin spirit, pinoline and rosin oil. The last enters into the composition of some of the solid lubricating greases, and is also used as an adulterant of other oils.

The chief region of rosin production includes Indonesia, southern China (such as Guangdong, Guangxi, Fujian, Yunnan and Jiangxi), and the northern part of Vietnam. Chinese rosin is obtained mainly from the turpentine of Masson's pine Pinus massoniana and slash pine P. elliottii.

The South Atlantic and eastern Gulf states of the United States is a second chief region of production. American rosin is obtained from the turpentine of longleaf pine Pinus palustris and loblolly pine P. taeda. In Mexico, most of the rosin is derived from live tapping of several species of pine trees, but mostly Pinus oocarpa, Pinus leiophylla, Pinus devoniana and Pinus montezumae. Most production is concentrated in the west-central state of Michoacán.

The main source of supply in Europe is the French district of Landes, in the departments of Gironde and Landes, where the maritime pine P. pinaster is extensively cultivated. In the north of Europe, rosin is obtained from the Scots pine P. sylvestris, and throughout European countries local supplies are obtained from other species of pine, with Aleppo pine P. halepensis being particularly important in the Mediterranean region.

Health effects 
The fumes released during soldering have been cited as a causative agent of occupational asthma. The symptoms also include desquamation of bronchial epithelium.

See also
 Copal
 Amber

Notes

References 

 Kent, James A. Riegel's Handbook of Industrial Chemistry (Eighth Edition). Van Nostrand Reinhold Company (1983). .

External links
 

Resins